This is a list of mosques in Ottawa, Ontario, Canada

In 2001, the number of Muslims in Ottawa was 80,000, according to Ottawa Muslim Cemetery Inc. Ottawa is experiencing a mosque building boom with half a dozen mosques being built or expanded.  The Assunah Muslims Association is building a mosque in Ottawa South and the Kanata Muslim Association is fundraising to seek a large location to replace the space it rents at a community centre.

See also 

 List of Ottawa churches
 List of Ottawa synagogues
 List of religious buildings in Ottawa
 List of mosques in the Americas
 List of mosques in Canada

References

External links 
 List of mosques with descriptions, directions and contact information

Mosques in Ottawa
Mosques in Ontario
Mosques
Mosques
Ottawa
Mosques in Ottawa-Gatineau